"The Bonfire of the Manatees" is the first episode of the seventeenth season of the American animated television series The Simpsons. It originally aired on the Fox network in the United States on September 11, 2005, making it the first Simpsons season premiere to air in September since the eleventh season opened with "Beyond Blunderdome" on September 26, 1999.

The episode was written by Dan Greaney and directed by Mark Kirkland. In its original broadcast, it was watched by around eleven million viewers.

Plot
Homer gets into trouble with the local mob over football gambling debts. As compensation, Fat Tony wants to use the Simpson home for shooting the adult film Lemony Lick-It's A Series of Horny Events, with the participation of Carl and Lenny. Homer gets Marge and the kids to leave the house by sending them off to "Santa's Village". Marge and the kids return home to find the production is still underway. Marge, outraged by Homer's latest bit of idiocy, leaves. Homer, home alone with the kids, tries to figure out what to do next.

Just as Marge is about ready to reconcile with Homer (though she flatly expresses that she is not interested in his gift of Kwik-E-Mart chocolates, half of which have test bites), she encounters Dr. Caleb Thorn, a good-looking scientist with a passion for saving the endangered manatee. Homer and the kids go on a quest to find Marge, and they stop and stay with their "country cousins" (their dog is Santa's Little Helper's brother). Meanwhile, Marge is finding herself while helping to save manatees. Caleb helps Marge realize that Homer is still the man she fell in love with, and the problem is that she still expects him to change.

Homer decides to win Marge back by saving a herd of manatees from a gang of abusing jet skiers. The gang initially agreed to leave, but return after hearing Homer calling them 'rubes'. He attempts to organize the manatees to battle the gang, but they all flee. However, the gang is dispersed when Homer's country cousin shows up with a notarized court order to have all jet skiers vacate the waters at once. Despite Homer's failure, Marge is impressed by his efforts to save the manatees and declares she is taking home "the real endangered species": "a devoted husband". The family decides to take a mini-vacation, and Homer gets a manatee sent to the power plant to fill in for his job for the next few days. When the manatee is about to die of dehydration, Mr. Burns and Smithers help him by washing him like a car, which the manatee actually enjoys.

Production
The idea for the episode was originally pitched on January 16, 2004, during the writers' idea sessions for The Simpsons Movie. Al Jean suggested the idea of the family rescuing manatees, and while it was rejected for the film, it was adapted into the script for the episode.

Cultural references
The title of this episode is a pun on the film The Bonfire of the Vanities (film).

The title of the adult film that is shot in the Simpson household Lemony Lick-It's A Series of Horny Events is a spoof of the film Lemony Snicket's A Series of Unfortunate Events though the scenes of A Series of Horny Events shown in the episode bare no resemblance to A Series of Unfortunate Events.

The song playing in the washing of the manatee scene is "Car Wash" by Rose Royce.

Reception
On May 11, 2008, Entertainment Weekly named Alec Baldwin's role as Caleb Thorn as the first of 16 great guest stars on The Simpsons.

The episode is also notable for having predicted the team matchup for Super Bowl XLVIII between the Denver Broncos and the Seattle Seahawks.

The title of the episode is a reference to the novel The Bonfire of the Vanities by Tom Wolfe.

References

External links 
 

The Simpsons (season 17) episodes
2005 American television episodes